Juman Darbadar Sand or Mama Juman Darbadar (12 May 1944 – 20 October 2022) Urdu (جمن دربدر), popularly know by his pen name Darbadar (meaning "wanderer") was a poet, writer and political activist. Darbadar was considered to be one of the greatest poets of the Sindhi language.

Career
He started as a political activist in political movements with the Sindhi nationalist G. M. Syed and others, fighting for the rights of poor people and opposed martial law in 1980s. He wrote revolutionary poetry from which  Wathi Har Har Janam Warbo is the most popular.

Death
Due to cardiac arrest, he was died on 20 October 2022. Many of the politicians and poets passed condolences on his demise. He was buried in Ruhal Vai village Umerkot.

References

Sindhi-language poets
Sindhi people
1944 births
2022 deaths
Pakistani poets
20th-century poets
Postmodern writers
Progressive Writers' Movement
20th-century Pakistani male writers